Lieutenant Colonel Sir Joseph William Lennox Napier, 4th Baronet of Merrion Square,  (1 August 1895 – 13 October 1986) was a British baronet and soldier who served in both the First and Second World Wars.

Napier married Isabelle Muriel Surtees (daughter of Major Henry Surtees) on 12 February 1931. He succeeded to the Baronetage of Merrion Square in 1915 on the death of his father, Sir William Napier, 3rd Baronet (1867–1915), and was succeeded by his son, Sir Robert Surtees Napier, 5th Baronet (1932–1994).

References
http://thepeerage.com/p30831.htm#i308306

Baronets in the Baronetage of the United Kingdom
1895 births
1986 deaths
South Wales Borderers officers
British Army personnel of World War I
British Army personnel of World War II
Officers of the Order of the British Empire